{{DISPLAYTITLE:C9H6O2}}
The molecular formula C9H6O2 (molar mass: 146.14 g/mol, exact mass: 146.036779 u) may refer to:

 Chromone
 Coumarin
 1,3-Indandione
 Isocoumarin
 Phenylpropiolic acid

Molecular formulas